Patricija Šulin (25 November 1965 – 2 November 2021) was a Slovenian politician. A member of the Slovenian Democratic Party and the European People's Party Group, she served in the European Parliament from 2014 to 2019 and in the National Assembly of Slovenia from 2012 to 2013.

References

1965 births
2021 deaths
Slovenian politicians
MEPs for Slovenia 2014–2019
European People's Party MEPs
Members of the National Assembly (Slovenia)
Slovenian Democratic Party politicians
People from the Municipality of Šempeter-Vrtojba